Gateway Unified School District is a school district in the north side of Redding, California. Gateway has one elementary school, two K-8 schools, and two high schools. James Harrell is the current superintendent.

The following are schools in this district:

Buckeye School of the Arts
Central Valley High School
Shasta Lake School
Mountain Lakes High School
Grand Oaks Elementary School
Rocky Point Charter School

References

External links
 

Redding, California
School districts in Shasta County, California